The 2006 Vancouver Whitecaps FC season was the club's 21st year of existence (or 31st if counting the NASL Whitecaps), as well as their 14th as a Division 2 club in the franchise model of US-based soccer leagues. 2006 was Bob Lilley's second season as head coach, and they started the season with many draws while the team sorted itself out.  In the last ten games after some player additions, the Whitecaps lost only two of their last ten games.  In the playoffs Vancouver went on a run as the fourth seed.  They first had a play-in round series against Miami FC Blues and Romário before upsetting regular season champion or Commissioner's Cup winner and Canadian rival Montreal Impact with two second half of overtime goals in the second leg away in La belle province.  The first goal scorer was Eduardo Sebrango, a striker out of favour in Montreal in 2005 (he was the 2004 leading goal scorer on the Impact)  that Vancouver signed in the off season.  In the single championship game at the regular season runner-up Rochester Rhinos' new home, PAETEC Park, the Whitecaps scored via an own goal just before half time and then put the game out of reach with two more goals to win 0 – 3.

The Whitecaps FC Women ruthlessly won the 2006 W-League Championship, the club's second, finishing with almost twice as many regular season points as the runner up in the Western Conference before 5 – 0 and 3 – 0 wins achieved the title.  The club also had four USL Super Y League teams play in the finals held in Florida.  This was the first time a club has won both the men's and women's United States D2 championships in the same year.

The league was a single table competition although the schedule was not balanced; it was home and away with additional matches against Seattle, Portland, and Minnesota. Head to head results were the first tie-breaker.  Average attendance increased for the fifth year in a row and was above 5,000 for the second time since 2001.  Two double-headers were played with the Whitecaps Women, the USL W-League.

The club also spent the year raising its local profile.  The team moved its live radio broadcasts to a new start up sports radio channel in 2006 for one year.  The Whitecaps Waterfront Stadium was in the local media before the season started although attempts to have the stadium ready for the 2007 FIFA U-20 World Cup were annulled with an unusually long six month review process.  The stadium was news-worthy again in June 2006 as it was recommended for inclusion in municipal development planning; note not approved for the planning process.  Once approved for the planning process, the process including rezoning would have taken an additional two years.  The stadium process started in 2003 and as of 2014 has not been built regardless of completely private financing.  The Whitecaps also partnered with a player marketing service for the player development program.  The club had sixteen teams in their club structure during 2006.

Schedule and results

Tables

Expanded Table

Pre-season

The Whitecaps opened their four-week training camp on March 27, 2006 at Simon Fraser University.   The preseason schedule was announced March 14, 2006 including a double header of the men's and women's teams versus the UVic Vikes.

USL-1

Results by round

Post-season

Bracket

Result
Play-in Round

Semi-finals

Final

Voyaguers Cup
Prior to 2008, from when it has been awarded to the Canadian Championship winners, the men's title was decided on regular-season matches between Canada's USL First Division sides.

Cascadia Cup

Whitecaps Nations Cup 
Due to the business success of neighbouring rivals' (Portland and Seattle) friendlies and the friendly with Sunderland A.F.C. in 2005 watched by 6,857, the Whitecaps marketed a four team tournament held from July 19–23, 2006.  The tournament was organized with the Vancouver Multicultural Society's CultureFest and the local 27th Annual Nations Cup soccer tournament for local amateur soccer enthusiasts. Welsh club Cardiff City FC also played matches in Victoria, Langley, and Seattle.
Due to the business success of neighbouring rivals' (Portland and Seattle)  friendlies and the friendly with Sunderland A.F.C. in 2005 watched by 6,857, the Whitecaps marketed a four team tournament held from July 19–23, 2006.  The tournament was organized with the Vancouver Multicultural Society's CultureFest and the local 27th Annual Nations Cup soccer tournament for local amateur soccer enthusiasts. Welsh club Cardiff City FC also played matches in Victoria, Langley, and Seattle.

Staff
John Rocha stepped down in August 2006 to focus on the 2007 FIFA U20 World Cup as Vancouver site chairman while continuing to support the Whitecaps in a consulting role.

Soccer Operations
 President – John Rocha
 General Manager – Bob Lenarduzzi
 Office Manager – Lindsay Puchlik
 Communication Manager – Nathan Vanstone
 Director Sales and Marketing – Rick Ramsbottom
 Men's Head Coach – Bob Lilley
 Men's Assistant Coach – Michael Toshack
 Reserve Team Men's Head Coach – Nick Dasovic
 Women's Head Coach – Bob Birarda
 Reserve Team Women's Head Coach – 
 Director Youth Operations – Dan Lenarduzzi

Current roster
2006 marked the most significant changes to the Whitecaps roster in the 20 years of club history with twelve new players signed at the start of the season.  The American coach Bob Lilley expanded the Whitecaps' recruiting more to the US college ranks, MLS, other USL-1 teams, and overseas.  He opined that the rate of the improvement in the league meant that the Whitecaps did not have time if they wanted to be competitive this year to develop local players, so the Whitecaps changed to a buyer in the player marketplace.  Local signings such as 2006's cohort of Andrew Corrazza, Diaz Kambere, and others stopped sticking with the team going forward.  As the profile of the club increased and ambitions for Division 1 grew, coaches had more pressure for immediate results and fewer local connections.  This was the beginning of a trend that gradually removed locally developed long-time career players from the Whitecaps first team through release or retirement that probably culminated with the retirement of Martin Nash after the 2010 season.

Twelve year Whitecap veteran defender and local Chris Franks retired after a spell with Doncaster Rovers F.C. Carlo Corazzin was also released.  Previous starting goalkeeper Five year Whitecap Mike Franks who didn't get any further minutes after recovering from injury in 2005 was also released.  Defender Mark Watson was released prior to the 2006 season and midfielder Nick Dasovic retired before the 2005 season to coach.

On March 28, the Whitecaps announced the trade of Daniel Antoniuk who was with Portland Timbers in 2005 to Montreal Impact for Eduardo Sebrango.  Bob Lilley was familiar with Eduardo Sebrango from his time coaching the Impact and Sebrango was recovering from injuries and saw little playing time in 2005.  As advertised in the signing announcement, he would score important, timely goals in big games both for and against the Whitecaps in the years to come.  They also announced the signing of 2005 MLS Columbus Crew midfielder/forward David Testo.

On April 7, 2006 the Whitecaps signed fullback John Jones and defender Anthony Noreiga.  The whitecaps signed locals Diaz Kambere and Stefan Leslie to amateur contracts as well as American midfielder Tony Donatelli, and forward Canadian Sita-Taty Matondo,  Another key signing was the English Premier League Newcastle United goalkeeper Tony Caig on April 13, 2006.  Due to injuries in midfield and forward requiring one of the regular defenders to move to midfield, in June the Whitecaps also signed defender Ryan Saurez.

The 2006 team was billed as much more offensive minded with greater depth at the forward and midfield positions.  The line up was relatively settled with 25 players getting playing minutes and seven getting about 2000 minutes or more.  James Alberts, Jeff Clarke, Joey Gjertsen, and David Morris appeared in all 28 games for the Whitecaps.  Despite preseason speculation the goal scoring was again singular, this year Joey Gjertsen was fourth in the league with 12 goals.  Martin Nash and Joey Gjertsen led the team in assists with both in the top ten league-wide.  Gjertsen's year for the champion Whitecaps, fourth in goals (12) and second in assists (7), earned him a league most valuable player award.

Goalkeeper stats

As of the end of the season.

Player statistics

External links

References

Vancouver Whitecaps (1986–2010) seasons
Vancouver Whitecaps